A liberal autocracy is a non-democratic government that follows the principles of liberalism. Until the 20th century, most countries in Western Europe were "liberal autocracies, or at best, semi-democracies". One example of a "classic liberal autocracy" was the Austro-Hungarian Empire. According to Fareed Zakaria, a more recent example is Hong Kong until 1 July 1997, which was ruled by the British Crown. He says that until 1991 "it had never held a meaningful election, but its government epitomized constitutional liberalism, protecting its citizens' basic rights and administering a fair court system and bureaucracy".

The existence of real liberties in many of these autocracies is very questionable. For instance, 19th century autocracies often abolished feudal institutions like serfdom, guilds, privileges for the nobility and inequality before the law, but freedom of speech and freedom of association were at best limited. As such, liberal autocracy often preceded various forms of electoral democracy in the evolution of these nations, being much more open than feudal monarchies, but less free than modern liberal democracies. Hong Kong is arguably a special case, where during the latter stages of British colonial rule there was considerable freedom of speech and freedom of association, but also the common knowledge that China would not allow an independent state with free elections. It was also suggested that since 2005 Egypt has been leaning towards liberal autocracy.

References

See also 
 Authoritarian capitalism
 Illiberal democracy
 Autocracy
 Enlightened absolutism
 Liberal democracy
 Political liberalism

History of liberalism
Mixed government